John Carl Wittig (June 16, 1914 – February 24, 1999), nicknamed "Hans", was an American professional baseball pitcher. He played all or part of five seasons in Major League Baseball between 1938 and 1949 seasons for the New York Giants (1938–39, 1941, 1943) and Boston Red Sox (1949). He was born in Baltimore, Maryland, to German immigrants.
 
In a five-season-career, Wittig posted a 10–25 record with a 4.89 ERA in 84 appearances, including 39 starts, seven complete games, one shutout, four saves, 121 strikeouts, 163 walks, and 307 innings of work.
 
Wittig died in Nassawadox, Virginia, at the age of 84.

References

External links

1914 births
1999 deaths
Baltimore Orioles (IL) players
Baseball players from Baltimore
Boston Red Sox players
Dover Orioles players
Jersey City Giants players
Johnstown Johnnies players
Major League Baseball pitchers
New York Giants (NL) players
People from Nassawadox, Virginia
Portsmouth Cubs players
Rochester Red Wings players
Syracuse Chiefs players